The Museum of Moscow is one of the oldest museums of the city of Moscow, Russia. Its collection was established on the initiative of Russian scientific community in 1896. The Moscow City Duma gave it a large collection of exhibits. 
In the 20th century the museum several times changed its name and location. 
In 1921 the museum was called Moscow Municipal Museum and was located in Sukharev Tower. In 1940 was renamed the Museum of History and Reconstruction of Moscow. In 1987 the museum got its present name.

References

External links 
 Official website of Museum
 Moscow City Museum
 Museum of History of Moscow

City museums
History museums in Russia
Museums in Moscow
Decorative arts museums in Russia